CVW2 may refer to:

Carrier Air Wing Two, (CVW-2) a United States Navy aircraft carrier air wing at Naval Air Station Lemoore
Vernon/Wildlife Water Aerodrome, the ICAO code for the airport in Canada